Kentucky Route 171 (KY 171) is a 28.702-mile (46.191 km) state highway in Kentucky that runs from Kentucky Route 106 northeast of Elkton to U.S. Route 62 in southeast Greenville.

Route description 
KY 171 starts at a junction with KY 106 between Elkton and Claymour. It goes in a westerly path to intersect KY 181, and then turns north-northwest to Allegre where it intersects KY 507 (Pilot Rock Road)] It then goes further north to intersect KY 107 at Kirkmansville. The route then enters Muhlenberg County and traverses the community of Weir. It meets its end in the southern outskirts of Greenville at a junction with U.S. Route 62 (US 62).

Major intersections

References

0171
0171
171